Lance McCutcheon (born February 28, 1999) is an American football wide receiver for the Los Angeles Rams of the National Football League (NFL). He played college football at Montana State.

Early life and high school
McCutcheon grew up in Bozeman, Montana and attended Bozeman High School. As a senior, he caught 40 passes for 780 yards and 12 touchdowns on offense and also intercepted 10 passes on defense while playing cornerback.

College career
McCutcheon played for four seasons with the Montana State Bobcats. He caught 13 passes for 197 yards and two touchdowns in his junior season. As a senior, he caught 61 passes for 1,219 yards and scored nine total touchdowns and was named first-team All-Big Sky Conference.

Professional career

McCutcheon signed with the Los Angeles Rams as an undrafted free agent on May 5, 2022. He was waived by the team on May 17, 2022. McCutcheon was re-signed by the Rams two days later. He made the Rams' initial 53-man roster out of training camp.

References

External links
Montana State Bobcats bio
Los Angeles Rams bio

Living people
American football wide receivers
Players of American football from Montana
Montana State Bobcats football players
Los Angeles Rams players
1999 births